Pipestela terpenensis is a species of sponge belonging to the family Axinellidae. 

The species was first described in 1993 by Jane Fromont as Amphimedon terpenensis from a specimen collected at a depth of 19 m on  MacGillivray Reef, Lizard Island in the  Great Barrier Reef. The species epithet, terpenensis, was given because of the large proportion of terpenes in this sponge.

Description 
P. terpenensis is a red-brown sponge with a thin maroon band due partially to the sponge's pigment but also to a symbiont cyanobacteria. It is tall and sometimes the branches look like flattened organ pipes.

Habitat 
It grows on reefs in full light, on dead coral or rock at depths of 10 to 20.

References

Axinellidae
Sponge genera
Taxa described in 1993
Taxa named by Jane Fromont